Gary Cohler is an American bridge player.

Bridge accomplishments

Wins

 North American Bridge Championships (8)
 Freeman Mixed Board-a-Match (1) 2010 
 Grand National Teams (5) 1995, 2004, 2011, 2012, 2013 
 Jacoby Open Swiss Teams (1) 2000 
 Reisinger (1) 2006

Runners-up

 North American Bridge Championships
 von Zedtwitz Life Master Pairs (1) 2001 
 Lebhar IMP Pairs (1) 1998 
 Rockwell Mixed Pairs (1) 2002 
 North American Pairs (2) 1995, 1996 
 Grand National Teams (1) 2005 
 Reisinger (1) 2000

Notes

American contract bridge players
Living people
Year of birth missing (living people)
Place of birth missing (living people)